Archway Hospital was a name used to refer to the infirmary building which opened in 1879 on Archway Road in Highgate, London.

History
The facility has its origins in the Holborn Union Infirmary, which was designed by Henry Saxon Snell and opened in 1879. It became the Holborn and Finsbury Hospital in 1921.

In 1928, the hospital took over the Prudential Assurance Company's Furnival House hostel for domestic servants in Cholmeley Park for use as a nurses' home.

The hospital was taken over by the London County Council in 1930 and renamed Archway Hospital. It became the Archway Wing of the Whittington Hospital on the establishment of the NHS in 1948.

In 1998, the Archway Wing was jointly purchased by University College London and Middlesex University to form the Archway campus. The teaching and research facility closed in 2013 and the site was sold to the Peabody Trust for redevelopment.

See also
Highgate Hospital

References

Defunct hospitals in London
Hospitals established in 1879
1879 establishments in England